Trashi Chöling Hermitage is a historical hermitage, belonging to Sera Monastery. It is located north of Lhasa in Tibet.

Footnotes
The Tibetan and Himalayan Library

Sera Monastery
Buddhist hermitages in Lhasa